The Minister for Zero Carbon Buildings, Active Travel and Tenants’ Rights is a junior ministerial post in the Scottish Government. As a result, the minister does not attend the Scottish Cabinet but reports directly to the First Minister of Scotland. The current Minister is Patrick Harvie, who was appointed in August 2021 after the Bute House Agreement.

History 
The office was created in August 2021 alongside the Minister for Green Skills, Circular Economy and Biodiversity after the Scottish Government agreed a power-sharing deal with the Scottish Green Party.

Overview

Responsibilities 
The specific responsibilities of the minister are:

 active travel
 Future Transport Fund
 energy efficiency
 heat networks
 heating and domestic energy transformation
 building standards
 new deal for tenants
 Future Generations Commissioner
 Serving as a member of the Cabinet Sub-Committee on Legislation

List of office holders

References

External links 

 Scottish Government website

Scottish Parliament
Zero Carbon Buildings, Active Travel and Tenants' Rights